Ranjit Barot (born 1959) is an Indian film score composer, music director, music arranger, drummer and singer based in Mumbai, India. He is a longtime associate of A. R. Rahman.

He has been described by guitar legend John McLaughlin as "one of the leading edges in drumming", and is now part of John McLaughlin and the 4th Dimension.

Early life and background
Born into a family steeped in Indian classical music and dance, melody and rhythm has always been an integral part of Ranjit's life. His mother was the renowned Kathak dancer, Sitara Devi.

His response to the western drum kit, even at the age of 12, was almost organic and his natural flair, ease and craft catapulted him onto becoming one of India's leading artists on the instrument at the age of 17. In 1980 he performed at the Jazz Yatra in Europe with the Jazz Yatra Sextet (with Louis Banks), besides performing with Pandit Ravi Shankar's ensemble on the same tour. This phase saw journeys to Europe and the West with leading Indian jazz/pop and classical musicians. Between 1980 and 1982, Ranjit performed at European festivals which also featured jazz greats such as Miles Davis, Dizzy Gillespie, Al Foster, Billy Higgins, Cecil Taylor and Louie Bellson, among others.

Career
Ranjit draws from his ancestry from the North of Indian (Uttar Pradesh) and from the West of India (Gujarat). His father is Gujarati and his mother is from Varanasi.

Ranjit has also had a long career in composition and music production, working out of his own state-of-the-art studio facility in Mumbai. It is in this connection that he had the honour of working with the sound and music production industry legend, the amazing Bruce Swedien, who mixed Ranjit's songs on Vande Mataram 2 and Senso Unico, an Indo-Italian feature film. Bruce has had a great influence on Ranjit's musical life and approach to a lot of his contemporary work.
Combined with his strong roots in the Indian classical tradition, his world view of music gave him a unique perspective on the Indian Film genre.

His journey in this prolific industry started in the 80s and he has been a featured drummer and arranger for Industry giants such as R.D. Burman, Laxmikant – Pyarelal, Kalyanji – Anandji, continuing through the eras of Anu Malik and Ismail Darbar, and to the present, as one of the most sought after arranger/ producers.

His work in this field has also earned him much acclaim and recognition as a Music Composer and Arranger for Album Projects and Feature Films.

Ranjit has been an integral part of some of A.R. Rahman's greatest work through the years and continues to bring his unique personality to this genre of music.

He has had the distinct honour of performing often with Maestro Zakir Hussain, including a Masters of Percussion Tour of the US and Canada. Ranjit's versatility as a drummer/ musician has led to unique collaborations with varied artists such as Carnatic mandolin legend, U. Srinivas, Carnatic violin maestro L. Subramaniam, Hindustani slide guitar master exponent, Pandit Vishwa Mohan Bhatt, sarangi.

At the Jazz Yatra '80, he performed with the Jazz Yatra Sextet, and also performed with the great Pandit Ravi Shankar's ensemble, Jazzmine, featuring John Handy, George Adams and Mike Richmond of the Mingus Dynasty.

On the Jazz Sextet's first European tour, Ranjit met Don Cherry. There was an instant connection, primarily because of Don's free spirited approach to life, one in which everyone was welcome, as part of his 'family'. He immediately took a liking to Ranjit and invited him to jam at a jazz club in Warsaw. This connection eventually led to a performance at the 1982 Jazz Yatra in Bombay.

His approach to drumming and the use of vocabulary has been influenced by great rhythm masters such as tabla legends Ustad Allarakha and Ustad Zakir Hussain, Billy Cobham, Tony Williams, Elvin Jones, Steve Gadd, Omar Hakim, Al Foster, Peter Erskin and the Carnatic giants such as Palghat Raghu and Karaikudi Mani (mridangam), Palnivel (tavill), Hari Shankar (Khanjira), and his friend and teacher, Sridhar Parthsarthy (mridangam, hand percussion).

His collaborations with musicians abroad have included unique performances with renowned artists such as John McLaughlin, Jonas Helborg, Ayden Esen, and Tim Garland.

He has been always inspired by the path-breaking work of guitar legend, John McLaughlin and was featured as the drummer in his Grammy nominated album Floating Point.

Ranjit has released his highly acclaimed debut album, titled 'Bada Boom', worldwide in November 2010, featuring some of the greatest musicians on the scene today, from India and the West. This album is a collection of Ranjit's Jazz Fusion and World compositions with performances by Ustad Zakir Hussain, John McLaughlin, U. Srinivas, U. Rajesh, Scott Kinsey, Matt Garrison, Wayne Krantz, Dominique Di Piazza, Harmeet Manseta, Taufique Qureshi, Sanjay Divecha, Tim Garland, Gwilym Symcock, Ayden Esen and Elie Afif, to name a few. Ranjit has recently been the Music Composer and Sound Designer for the entire Opening and Closing Ceremonies of the Commonwealth Games Delhi 2010, and is representing India with his Live Performance at the "India Inclusive' showcase at WEF, Davos 2011. 
He leads the band of AR Rahman Live

Filmography

As background music composer
Shaitan (10 June 2011) (Released)
Thanks Maa (5 March 2010) (Released)
Yeh Mera India (28 August 2009) (Released)
Toss (28 August 2009) (Released)
Sankat City (10 July 2009) (Released)
Mere Baap Pehle Aap (13 June 2008) (Released)
Tashan (25 April 2008) (Released)
Bhool Bhulaiyaa (12 October 2007) (Released)
Black & White (7 March 2008) (Released)
Cash (3 August 2007) (Released)
Aryan: Unbreakable (15 December 2006) (Released)
Tathastu (12 May 2006) (Released)
Dus (8 July 2005) (Released)
Main Hoon Na (30 April 2004) (Released)
Rishtey (6 December 2002) (Released)
Hathyar (18 October 2002) (Released)
Aks (13 July 2001) (Released)
Fiza (8 September 2000) (Released)
Tera Jadoo Chal Gayaa (2000) (Released)

As a lyricist
Brides Wanted (2010)

As music director
Muskurake Dekh Zara (23 April 2010) (Released)
Brides Wanted (2010) (Stuck/On Hold)
Acid Factory (9 October 2009) (Released)
Sankat City(10 July 2009) (Released)
Chhodon Naa Yaar(5 October 2007) (Released)
Urchagam – Tamil (2 September 2007) (Released)
Kanna - Tamil (2007) (Released)
Holiday (10 February 2006) (Released)
Chupke Se (12 September 2003) (Released)
Mumbai Se Aaya Mera Dost (22 August 2003) (Released)
Qayamat: City Under Threat(11 July 2003) (Released)
Fiza (8 September 2000) (Released)
V.I.P – Tamil (13 June 1997) (Released)
Oh Darling Yeh Hai India (11 August 1995) (Released)
Raakh(1989) (Released) (external links)
One Heart: The A. R. Rahman concert film

As sound designer
Tera Jadoo Chal Gayaa (2000) (Released)

As a playback singer
Muskurake Dekh Zara (23 April 2010) (Released)
Brides Wanted (2010) (Stuck/On Hold)
Acid Factory (9 October 2009) (Released)
Sankat City (10 July 2009) (Released)
Ru Ba Ru (12 September 2008) (Released)
V.I.P (Tamil) (1997) (Released)
Aryan – Unbreakable (15 December 2006) (Released)
Baabul (8 December 2006) (Released)
Pyare Mohan (21 April 2006) (Released)
Holiday (10 February 2006) (Released)
Dus (8 July 2005) (Released)
Main Hoon Na (30 April 2004) (Released)
Chupke Se (12 September 2003) (Released)
Shaitan(2011)(Released)
Oh Darling Yeh Hai India (11 August 1995) (Released) (external links)

As an Actor 

 99 Songs (2019); shot in Telugu, Hindi and Tamil

References

 Gomolo

External links
 
 
 
 
 

Living people
Indian male musicians
Indian film score composers
Bollywood playback singers
Indian male playback singers
Musicians from Mumbai
Indian music arrangers
Indian pop composers
Indian drummers
Jazz drummers
Gujarati people
1950 births
Indian male film score composers
Male jazz musicians
Art Metal (band) members
Male actors in Hindi cinema
Male actors in Telugu cinema